Jaykishan Anilbhai Kolsawala (born 10 October 1989) is an Indian cricketer. He has played cricket across all three of the major domestic formats in India for the Baroda cricket team as well as playing cricket in Nepal for Lalitpur Patriots since 2017 in the Everest Premier League. He has also played for Kathmandu Golden Warriors in Nepal's domestic Pokhara Premier League and for CYC Attariya in the Dhangadhi Premier League.

References

External links
 "Match Scorecard: Pokhara Premier League". Espncricinfo

1989 births
Living people
Indian cricketers
Baroda cricketers
People from Surat
Panadura Sports Club cricketers